Christel Justen (10 October 1957 – 20 January 2005) was a German breaststroke swimmer who won one gold and one silver medal at the 1974 European Aquatics Championships. The same year she set a new world record in the 100 m breastroke event and was selected as the German Sportspersonality of the Year.

She retired soon after 1974 to focus on her studies and later worked as a sports coach and physiotherapist. It was later revealed in 1993 that as a teenager she was given anabolic steroids by her coach without knowledge or consent of her parents. She died of natural causes, aged 47.

References

External links
Christel Justen. munzinger.de

1957 births
2005 deaths
German female swimmers
German female breaststroke swimmers
European Aquatics Championships medalists in swimming
20th-century German women
21st-century German women